Changhe is a metro station of Line 10 of Chongqing Rail Transit in Yubei District of Chongqing Municipality, China.

It serves the area surrounding the Industrial Zone of Taiwanese Business People.

The station opened on 28th of December 2017 and is the only above ground/elevated station on Line 10's Phase I project.

Station Structure

Line 10 Platform
Platform Layout
An island platform is used for Line 10 trains travelling in both directions.

Exits
There are a total of 2 entrances/exits for the station.

Surroundings

Nearby Places
The Industrial Zone of Taiwanese Business People
Smart Internet Industrial Zone
Lianggang Avenue

Nearby Stations
Terminal 3 of Jiangbei Airport station (a Line 10 Station)
Huanshan Park station (a Line 10 station)

See also
Chongqing Rail Transit (CRT)
Line 10 (CRT)

References

Railway stations in Chongqing
Railway stations in China opened in 2017
Chongqing Rail Transit stations